David R. Shonnard is an American engineer.  He is a Richard and Bonnie Robbins Chair in Sustainable Use of Materials and former director of the Michigan Technological University Sustainable Futures Institute.  He has expertise in systems analysis for sustainability, environmental life cycle assessments of renewable energy technologies, and chemical recycling of waste plastics for a circular economy.

Biography 
Shonnard earned a Ph.D. from the University of California at Davis and had appointments at Lawrence Livermore National Laboratory and the University of California at Berkeley prior to joining Michigan Technological University in 1993.  He has served on advisory committees for the DOE, UDSA, and the REMADE Institute in areas of biomass research and development and materials circular economy.  He is co-author of two green engineering and sustainable engineering textbooks and has published over 200 works appearing in peer-reviewed research journals, technical reports, and conference proceedings.

Research interests 
Shonnard has broad research interests that include diffusion and adsorption of pollutants in soils, atmospheric transport of hazardous compounds, environmetal risk assessment, in-situ subsurface remediation, environmentally-conscious design of chemical processes, advanced biofuels reaction engineering, and applications of pyrolysis to waste plastics recycling.  Sponsors of his research program include federal (NSF, DOE, DARPA, USDA, FAA), state (MI MTRAC), and numerous industrial firms.  He holds patents in enzymatic and chemical conversion technologies and is founder of a company, SuPyRec, to commercialize chemical recycling of waste plastics.

Select publications 

 Economic and environmental analysis of plastics pyrolysis after secondary sortation of mixed plastic waste (2023) Daniel G. Kulas, Ali Zolghadr, Utkarsh S. Chaudhari, and David R. Shonnard, Journal of Cleaner Production
 Liquid-fed waste plastic pyrolysis pilot plant: Effect of reactor volume on product yields (2022) Daniel G. Kulas, Ali Zolghadr, and David R. Shonnard, Journal of Analytical and Applied Pyrolysis
 Pyrolysis-Aided Microbial Biodegradation of High-Density Polyethylene Plastic in Environmental Inocula Enrichment Cultures (2022)  Emily Byrne, Laura G. Schaerer, Daniel G. Kulas, Sharath K. Ankathi, Lindsay I. Putman, Kierstyn R. Codere, Simeon K. Schum, David R. Shonnard, and Stephen M. Techtmann,  ACS Sustainable Chemistry and Engineering

References 

Living people
Year of birth missing (living people)
Place of birth missing (living people)
Chemical engineering academics
University of California, Davis alumni
University of Nevada, Reno alumni
Michigan Technological University faculty
American company founders